Harvard Pilgrim Health Care is a non-profit health services company based in Canton, Massachusetts serving the New England region of the United States.

On August 14, 2019, the boards of Harvard Pilgrim Health Care and Tufts Health Plan announced plans for the  two insurers to merge their organizations into a new company. The new company serves 2.4 million members in Massachusetts, Maine, Connecticut, New Hampshire, and Rhode Island. The merger completed on January 1, 2021, making the then unnamed company the second largest health insurer in Massachusetts. On June 15, 2021, the new name of the parent company was announced as Point32Health, named for the 32 points on a compass.

Overview 
Harvard Pilgrim Health Care was formed in 1994 from the merger of the Harvard Community Health Plan (HCHP) and the Pilgrim Health Plan. Harvard Community Health Plan had been founded in 1969. One of its founders was Maurice Lazarus.

Harvard Pilgrim is home to the Harvard Pilgrim Health Care Institute, a collaboration with Harvard Medical School. As Harvard Medical School’s Department of Population Medicine, the Institute is the only appointing department of a U.S. medical school housed within a health plan. Funded primarily through external government and private sources, it provides information to the health care system on issues affecting population health and health care delivery.

Awards and recognition 
  Boston Business Journal  - a Best Place to Work (2003 - 2017)
  Boston Business Journal - a Top Corporate Philanthropist (2007 - 2015)
  The Boston Globe  - a Top Place to Work (2009 - 2015)
  Human Rights Campaign  - a Best Place to Work (2013 - 2016)

Key people 
 Charlie Baker, former CEO and governor of Massachusetts

References

External links 
 

1994 establishments in Massachusetts
American companies established in 1994
Companies based in Norfolk County, Massachusetts
Health care companies based in Massachusetts
Health care companies established in 1994
Wellesley, Massachusetts